Nemtsov is a documentary film about Boris Nemtsov, the Russian opposition leader who was assassinated in Moscow on February 27, 2015. It was written, directed, and narrated by Vladimir V. Kara-Murza, a Russian journalist and historian and a longtime friend and colleague of Nemtsov. The executive producer of the film is Renat Davletgildeev, former deputy editor-in-chief of TV Rain.

Story 

Nemtsov chronicles the life and career of Boris Nemtsov from his work as a scientist and his activism in opposition to a nuclear plant in Gorky in the late Soviet period to his meteoric political rise in post-Soviet Russia, when he was elected to Parliament, implemented market reforms as governor of Nizhny Novgorod, was invited to become Russia’s deputy prime minister, and was widely seen as a future successor to President Boris Yeltsin; as well as in his later years as a leader of the democratic opposition in Vladimir Putin’s Russia. The documentary is primarily narrated through interviews with people who knew and worked with Nemtsov and contains rare archival footage, including from the Nemtsov family.

Kara-Murza described his film as “a portrait of Boris Nemtsov as he was; without slander, without propaganda, without the clichés and the lies… the real Nemtsov, not the caricature image created by the Kremlin.”

The film includes no direct mention of Nemtsov’s assassination. As the authors explained, “it is not about death. It is about the life of a man who could have been president of Russia.”

Screenings 

The film was first shown at the Boris Nemtsov Forum in Berlin on October 9, 2016; the Russian premiere was held in Nizhny Novgorod on November 30, 2016. Nemtsov has been screened in 37 cities in Russia, as well as in other countries in Europe and in North America. The screenings were attended by members of Russian regional legislatures, members of the European Parliament, and members of several national parliaments, including the U.S. Congress.

The Russian version of the film was publicly released online on October 9, 2017; the English-subtitled version was released on February 27, 2018.

Participants 

 Boris Abramovich
 Viktor Aksyuchits
 Vladimir Bukovsky
 Sergei Dorenko
 Lilia Dubovaya
 Tatiana Grishina
 Dmitry Gudkov
 Mikhail Kasyanov
 Irina Khakamada
 Mikhail Khodorkovsky
 Yevgeni Kiselev
 Yuri Lebedev
 Viktor Lysov
 Igor Maskaev
 John McCain
 Boris Nadezhdin
 Alexei Navalny
 Raisa Nemtsova
 Zhanna Nemtsova
 Olga Shorina
 Oleg Sysuev
 Strobe Talbott
 Ilya Yashin
 Sergei Yastrzhembsky
 Grigory Yavlinsky
 Valentin Yumashev
 Tatyana Yumasheva
 Nina Zvereva

Reviews 

According to Russian film critic Artemy Troitsky, Nemtsov "is what the French call hommage, that is to say a tribute. As a tribute, I think it is impeccable." Television commentator Arina Borodina noted that the authors have done "colossal archival work" and that the film depicts "a large, colorful, powerful, courageous life." "The film shows that Boris Nemtsov was a politician with a large degree of openness and sincerity, and that such position is, historically speaking, a winning one," wrote political analyst Alexander Morozov. Nemtsov's daughter Zhanna described Kara-Murza's documentary as "a film made by a friend about a friend"; in her words, "it is clear that this is not a detached view, it is a film Kara-Murza made about a loved one."

Awards 

In January 2018 for his work on Nemtsov Vladimir Kara-Murza was awarded the Sakharov Prize for Journalism as an Act of Conscience.

References

External links 

 Official website
 Nemtsov on YouTube
 «Немцов», Эхо Москвы, 9 октября 2017
 Для Немцова Путин был личным оскорблением, Радио Свобода, 11 октября 2016)
 Бориса Немцова помянули как первого нижегородского губернатора, Коммерсантъ, 30 ноября 2016
 В Нижнем Новгороде презентовали фильм «Немцов», ТК Волга, 30 ноября 2016
 Пост Владимира Кара-Мурзы в Facebook, 6 декабря 2016
 Кара-Мурза: Снимая фильм о Немцове, я открыл для себя новую степень человеческой трусости, Росбалт, 7 декабря 2016
 Борис Немцов глазами друзей и политических соратников, Голос Америки, 8 декабря 2016
 Слишком свободный человек, Радио Свобода, 8 декабря 2016
 Премьера фильма «Немцов», ПАРНАС TV, 9 декабря 2016
 В Ярославле с аншлагом прошел показ фильма «Немцов», Ярновости, 13 декабря 2016
 Публицист Владимир Кара-Мурза-младший: «Немцов» — это фильм, которого не должно было быть, 7х7, 13 декабря 2016
 Там нет смерти, там нет моста, Idel.Реалии, 14 декабря 2016
 Screenings of Nemtsov Documentary Held in Russia, Institute of Modern Russia
 «Немцов». Фильм, которого не должно было быть, Ельцин-Центр, 25 января 2017
 Открытый показ фильма «Немцов» стал закрытым: организаторам не удалось найти доступную для широкого показа площадку, Тюмень PRO, 14 января 2017
 В Новосибирске прошел закрытый показ фильма "Немцов", Радио Свобода, 29 января 2017
 Владимир Кара-Мурза: «Убийство Немцова раскроют не при этой власти», Караван, 8 февраля 2017
 In Memoriam: Three 2016 Documentaries about Boris Nemtsov, The New Contemporary, 14 марта 2017
 В Петрозаводске показали «Немцова», 7х7, 31 марта 2017
 В Иванове прошел показ фильма «Немцов», IvanovoNews, 15 апреля 2017
 "Никого из России вывозить не будем". Жанна Немцова рассказала, для чего создает академический центр в Праге, ТК , 10 мая 2017
 Du kartus bandymą nunuodyti išgyvenęs Kremliaus kritikas V.Kara-Murza: „Nebenorime kito Putino“, 15min, May 22, 2017
 В Костроме состоялись показ фильма «Немцов» и скайп-конференция с его автором, 7х7, 28 мая 2017
 Человек-бренд: фильм «Немцов» показали в Вашингтоне, Голос Америки, 3 мая 2017
 Кара-Мурза: «Некоторые отказались сниматься в фильме о Немцове», Голос Америки, 4 мая 2017
 Nemtsov Film Screenings Open in the U.S., Institute of Modern Russia
 Настоящее время. Итоги, Голос Америки, 12 мая 2017
 Boris Nemtsov’s Legacy Haunts Putin’s Russia, National Review, May 24, 2017
 В Европарламенте показали фильм о Борисе Немцове, ТК Белсат, 8 июня 2017
 Vladimir Kara-Murza: O životě a smrti Borise Němcova, Knihovna Václava Havla, June 20, 2017
 Nemtsov: Film Screening and Discussion, National Endowment for Democracy, September 15, 2017
 Фильм о Борисе Немцове, LTV7, 27 сентября 2017
 Двоих журналистов «Новой газеты» наградят премией им. Сахарова «За журналистику как поступок», Новая газета, 20 декабря 2017
 Премия им. Сахарова за фильм «Немцов», Эхо Москвы, 31 января 2018
 Сайт Открытой России получил орден «За мужество» премии имени Андрея Сахарова «За журналистику как поступок», МБХ медиа, 31 января 2018
 A Film of Shakespearean Proportions: Kara-Murza's "Nemtsov", The Skidmore News, February 13, 2018
 , World Affairs, February 27, 2018
 Фильм «Немцов»: дополнительные материалы, Эхо Москвы, 27 февраля 2018

2016 documentary films
Russian documentary films
2016 films